Southbound is an album by folk-rock writer & country singer Hoyt Axton, released in 1975. It reached #27 on the US country charts and #188 on the Billboard 200.

Track listing
Side 1
"I Love to Sing" (Bob Lind) – 2:00
"Southbound" (Hoyt Axton, Mark Dawson) – 2:27
"Lion in Winter" (Hoyt Axton) – 3:20
"Blind Fiddler" (Traditional; arranged by Hoyt Axton) – 2:25
"Pride of Man" (Hoyt Axton, David P. Jackson) – 3:15
"Greensleeves" (Traditional; arranged by Hoyt Axton) – 3:45
"No No Song" (Hoyt Axton, David P. Jackson) – 2:39

Side 2
"Nashville" (Hoyt Axton) – 3:35
"Speed Trap (Out of State Cars)" (Hoyt Axton) – 2:25
"Roll Your Own" (Mel McDaniel) – 2:08
"Whiskey" (Hoyt Axton) – 2:12
"In a Young Girl's Mind" (Hoyt Axton, Mark Dawson) – 3:25
"Sometimes It's Easy" (Hoyt Axton) – 1:58

Personnel
Mike Botts, John Guerin - drums
Jerry Scheff, Emory Gordy, Max Bennett, Joe Lamanto - bass
George Clinton, David Jackson - piano
Marty Howard, Dick Rosmini, Hoyt Axton, Jeff Baxter, Mark Dawson, Frank Rekard - acoustic guitar
Jeff Baxter, James Burton, Roger Johnson - electric guitar
Jeff Baxter - dobro, steel guitar 
John Hartford - fiddle
Doug Dillard - banjo
Mark Dawson - harmonica
Roger Johnson - autoharp 
Victor Feldman - marimba 
Jerry Scheff - tuba
Dick Hyde - trombone
Johnny Rotella - clarinet, recorder
Gail Davies - tambourine
David Jackson - electric piano
Gustavo Ramos, Francisco Arellano - Mariachi trumpets
Paul Lewinson - celeste
Cheech & Chong - "attempted temptation"

Horns
Johnny Rotella
Jerome Richardson
Jay Migliori
Dick Hyde
Ollie Mitchell

Featured background singers
Renee Armand
Judy Elliott
Lee Montgomery
Mark Dawson

Street Singers
Jana Ballan, Guthrie Thomas, James Scott, Dennis Brooks, Ronee Blakley, Dana Brady, Bob Lind, William Farmer, Sharon Mack, Joan and Alexander Sliwin, Jules Alexander, Carol Payne, Valerie Carter, Wendy Webb, Mark Keller, Linda Chandler, Gail Davies, David Hasselhoff, David Stafford, Tom Jans, Bryon Walls, David P. Jackson, Jan-Michael Vincent, John T. Axton & Cindy Shubin

Production
Produced by Hoyt Axton and Henry Lewy
Arranged by Paul Lewinson
Sound Engineer – Henry Lewy assisted by Ellis Sorkin and John L. Sisti
Recorded at A&M Recording Studios, Hollywood, California
Album photos – Suzanne Ayres
Album design – Chuck Beeson
Liner design – Rod Dyer

References

1975 albums
Hoyt Axton albums
A&M Records albums